Flekke is a village in the municipality of Fjaler in Vestland, Norway.

The village is situated at the end of the Flekkefjorden, an arm of the Dalsfjorden. A few kilometers north of Flekke, lies the village of Haugland, while the bay continues south to Trollvika and a narrow strait into Flosjøen.

Haugland Rehabilitation Centre is owned by the Red Cross District of Sogn and Fjordane, and is part of the Norwegian Health Care System.

References

Villages in Vestland
Fjaler